The 1902 Arbitral award of the Andes between Argentina and Chile was a British arbitration in 1902 that established the present-day boundaries between Argentina and Chile. In northern and central Patagonia, the borders were established between the latitudes of 40° and 52° S as an interpretation of the Boundary treaty of 1881 between Chile and Argentina. 

As result of the arbitration, some Patagonian lakes, such as O'Higgins/San Martín Lake, became divided by a national boundary. Additionally the preferences of settled colonists in a cultivated part of the area in dispute had been canvassed. The boundary proposed in the arbitration was a compromise between the boundary preferences of the two disputing governments, which strictly followed neither the alignment of highest peaks nor the fluvial watershed, and was published in the name of King Edward VII.

Background
Pactos de Mayo
Boundary treaty of 1881 between Chile and Argentina
Uti possidetis
Divortium aquorum

Preparations and geographic surveys
Francisco Perito Moreno
Hans Steffen

British arbitration

The escalation in tension between Chile and Argentina suggested armed conflict had become a distinct probability towards the end of the 19th Century as both had claims on Patagonia.  The Argentinian Riccheri Law continued to provide for selective national service; the expansion of the Argentine armed forces after the campaigns and subjugation of the Pampas and expanded southwards and westwards into Patagonia in the "Conquest of the Desert".  Argentina and Chile had successfully reached a measure of mutual agreement in the Boundary Treaty of 1881 and subsequently identified other boundary alignment issues to be resolved by binding arbitration under the 1902 "May Pact"  and sought the involvement of the UK as mediator.

Commissioners Francisco Moreno (Argentina), Diego Barros Arana (Chile) and Sir Thomas Holdich (UK) visited the Andean Patagonian valleys to make site-based observations following the written submissions presented previously by the two parties to the Arbitration Panel.

Since 1885, the valleys of what is now northwestern Chubut Province had been settled by many Welsh emigrants. This area drained to the Pacific Ocean, hence Chile claimed it. Subsequently, the commissioners visited Trevelin and received the views of the inhabitants of the "Colonia del Valle 16 de Octubre" on 30 April 1902, for three days, in School Number 18, which had been founded in 1895 next to the river Corintios by the Argentine National Government.  The arbitration award was finally adjudicated in favour of the Republic of Argentina, and Trevelin, Esquel and other adjacent settlements were subsequently incorporated into Chubut Province.

Research by Gustavo De Vera and Jorge Fiori starting in 1998 was published as the "Winds of War" in 2002 to coincide with the centenary, for the Directorate of Culture, Trevelin, has investigated the background and events around the "1902 Referendum".  They have concluded that the views of the inhabitants, whilst not the sole determinate, were certainly influential in founding an acceptable alignment for the national boundary in this part of Patagonia.

Boundary
In some areas such as Aysén Region, the Chilean claims were partly agreed, giving Chile foothold on the lakes and plains east of the Andes, while in some other areas the Argentine thesis of the Snowy Cordillera prevailed as the boundary.

Subsequent disputes
In the area of the Campo de Hielo Sur, the large ice-covered area in the Patagonian Andes, the border discussions have continued after 1902. (See :es:Litigio del campo de hielo Patagónico Sur.)

References

Attribution

External links
The Cordillera of the Andes Boundary Case - full text at UN

Argentina–Chile treaties
Argentina–Chile border
1902 in Argentina
1902 in Chile
Boundary treaties
Arbitration cases
Treaties concluded in 1902
Territorial disputes of Argentina
Territorial disputes of Chile
November 1902 events